Pairara is a suco in the Lautém Municipality of East Timor.

Population
The population of Pairara in 2015 was 2,164 inhabitants living in an area of 26.77 km2, with a population density of 80.85 inhabitants per km2.

References 

 Statoids.com

Lautém Municipality